One Mo' Time is the tenth studio album by Australian rock band The Black Sorrows. The album was released in August 2004 and The Black Sorrows re-recording some of their classic material in an acoustic setting.

Upon release, lead singer Joe Camilleri said; "You take the job on for various reasons. Sometimes it's the money. Sometimes you got nothing to do. Other times it's the challenge. It's a hardcore thing, to go back to some songs that, whether you've done them justice or not, are part of Australian history. It's a brave thing to do."

Reception
Inpress magazine said the album is "A hand-tooled model of a national treasure".

Track listing 
 CD track listing (BLUE0702 )
 "Harley + Rose" (Joe Camilleri, Nick Smith) - 3:47
 "The Chosen Ones" (Camilleri, Smith) - 5:28
 "Dear Children" (Camilleri, Smith) - 4:17
 "Daughters of Glory" (Camilleri, Smith) - 3:25
 "Ain't Love the Strangest Thing" (Camilleri, Laurie Polec) - 5:15
 "Snake Skin Shoes" (Camilleri, Jeff Griffin) - 3:41
 "Brown Eyed Girl" (Van Morrison) - 3:41
 "That's What I'd Give For Your Love" (Camilleri, Smith) - 4:16
 "Hold On to Me" (Camilleri, Smith) - 4:43
 "Mystified" (Camilleri, Smith)	- 4:11
 "Lucky Charm" (Camilleri, Smith) - 4:46
 "Country Girls" (Camilleri, Smith) - 3:29
 "Better Times" (Camilleri, Polec) - 5:06
 "Come On, Come On" (Camilleri, Polec) - 3:06

Charts
One Mo' Time entered the ARIA Jazz and Blues chart at number 19 for the week commencing 18 October 2004. It peaked at number 14, for the week commencing 24 November 2004.

Tour
The Black Sorrows celebrated the release of the album with a national tour across November 2004.

 2 Nov - Subiaco Race Track, Perth, WA
 5 Nov - Pemberton Community Centre, Perth, WA
 11 Nov - Kedron-Wavell Services Club, Kedron, QLD
 12 Nov - Southport RSL, Southport, QLD
 13 Nov - Mooloolaba Surf Club, Mooloolaba, QLD
 14 Nov - Carindale Tavern, Carindale, QLD
 24 Nov - The Famous Spiegeltent, Melbourne, VIC
The Black Sorrows also performed an acoustic set of their tracks at A Day On The Green throughout November and December 2004.

References

External links
 "One Mo' Time" at discogs.com

2004 albums
The Black Sorrows albums
Liberation Records albums
Albums produced by Joe Camilleri